The 1925 Wimbledon Championships took place on the outdoor grass courts at the All England Lawn Tennis and Croquet Club in Wimbledon, London, United Kingdom. The tournament ran from 22 June until 4 July. It was the 45th staging of the Wimbledon Championships, and the third Grand Slam tennis event of 1925.

Because Suzanne Lenglen, Jean Borotra and René Lacoste played finals on Saturday, the finals of the Men's Doubles and Mixed Doubles took place on Monday 6 July.

Suzanne Lenglen won all three events she entered; the women's singles, the women's doubles, and the mixed doubles.

Champions

Men's singles

 René Lacoste defeated  Jean Borotra, 6–3, 6–3, 4–6, 8–6

Women's singles

 Suzanne Lenglen defeated  Joan Fry, 6–2, 6–0

Men's doubles

 Jean Borotra /  René Lacoste defeated  Raymond Casey /  John Hennessey, 6–4, 11–9, 4–6, 1–6, 6–3

Women's doubles

 Suzanne Lenglen /  Elizabeth Ryan defeated  Kathleen Bridge /  Mary McIlquham, 6–2, 6–2

Mixed doubles

 Jean Borotra /  Suzanne Lenglen defeated  Uberto de Morpurgo /  Elizabeth Ryan, 6–3, 6–3

References

External links
 Official Wimbledon Championships website

 
Wimbledon Championships
Wimbledon Championships
Wimbledon Championships
Wimbledon Championships